Eric Gouaux is an American biochemist and biophysicist who holds the Jennifer and Bernard Lacroute Term Chair at the Vollum Institute at the Oregon Health & Science University.

Education
Gouaux studied chemistry at Harvard University, from which he received both his B.A. in 1984 and his Ph.D. in 1989. He remained in Cambridge as a postdoctoral fellow, first at Harvard and then at the Massachusetts Institute of Technology.

Academic career
Gouaux joined the faculty of the University of Chicago in 1993. Three years later, he moved to Columbia University, where he became a full professor in 2001. He moved to the Vollum Institute at the Oregon Health & Science University in 2005 and was appointed the Jennifer and Bernard Lacroute Endowed Chair in Neuroscience Research in 2015.

Gouaux was a recipient of the Searle Scholars Program award in 1994 and became a Howard Hughes Medical Institute Investigator in 2000. He was elected to the United States National Academy of Sciences in 2010.

 Pharmacology Krebs Lecture, University of Washington (2013)

Research
Research in Gouaux's laboratory focuses on the molecular biochemistry of chemical synapses, particularly on the structures of proteins such as receptors and ion channels and on their response to neurotransmitters. His research group uses structural biology techniques such as X-ray crystallography and cryo-electron microscopy, as well as electrophysiology. In 2018, Gouaux became the principal investigator for a new cryo-electron microscopy center hosted by OHSU and the Pacific Northwest National Laboratory, one of three such centers financed by the National Institutes of Health.

References

American biochemists
American biophysicists
Oregon Health & Science University faculty
Members of the United States National Academy of Sciences
Harvard College alumni
Year of birth missing (living people)
Living people
Harvard Graduate School of Arts and Sciences alumni
Members of the National Academy of Medicine